The Order of Merit of the Republic of Poland is a Polish order of merit created in 1974, awarded to persons who have rendered great service to Poland. It is granted to foreigners or Poles resident abroad. As such it is sometimes referred to as a traditional "diplomatic order".

History

The order was established by an act of 10 April 1974, as the Order of Merit of the Polish People's Republic (Order Zasługi Polskiej Rzeczypospolitej Ludowej). The need for the new order had arisen since the Order of the White Eagle had fallen into disuse after the foundation of the People's Republic. Reflecting this history, the two orders utilized similar colors and designs. The Order of Merit of the Polish People's Republic was awarded in five classes: Grand Cordon of the Order, Commandery with Star, Commandery, Gold Badge of the Order, and Silver Badge of the Order. It was awarded by the Polish Council of State.

After the fall of communism in Poland in 1989, it was decided to retain the order, with necessary changes. Without a formal change of the 1974 act or the name of the order, the insignia were changed to the present ones by a presidential decree of 16 April 1991. The abbreviation "PRL" was changed to "RP," the Eagle was given a crown in accordance with Poland's new coat of arms, the date "1974" was removed from the reverse, and the color of the ribbon was changed from light cobalt blue to dark cobalt.

Under an act of 16 October 1992, the order was reestablished under the name Order of Merit of the Republic of Poland (Order Zasługi Rzeczypospolitej Polskiej).

Under the 1992 act, the order is awarded to foreigners or Poles resident abroad for distinguished contributions to international cooperation or cooperation between Poland and other countries. It is awarded by the President of Poland. Unlike the other national orders of Poland, it does not have a chapter.

Recipients of the Grand Cross of the Order of Merit of the Republic of Poland, the highest award of the class, have included Queen Elizabeth II, Henry Kissinger, and Edward Mosberg.

Degrees
From 1974 to 1991 the Order was awarded in following classes:
  1st class – Grand Cordon of the Order of Merit of the People's Republic of Poland
  2nd class – Commandery with Star of the Order of Merit of the People's Republic of Poland
  3rd class – Commandery of the Order of Merit of the People's Republic of Poland
  4th class – Gold Badge of the Order of Merit of the People's Republic of Poland
  5th class – Silver Badge of the Order of Merit of the People's Republic of Poland

Since 1992 the Order is awarded in the following classes:
  1st class – Grand Cross of the Order of Merit of the Republic of Poland
  2nd class – Commander's Cross with Star of the Order of Merit of the Republic of Poland
  3rd class – Commander's Cross of the Order of Merit of the Republic of Poland
  4th class – Officer's Cross of the Order of Merit of the Republic of Poland
  5th class – Knight's Cross of the Order of Merit of the Republic of Poland

See also
 Orders, decorations, and medals of Poland

Notes

References

 Polish Law of 16 October 1992 (Dz.U. 1992 nr 90 poz. 450) 
 Polish Law of 10 November 1992 (Dz.U. 1992 nr 90 poz. 452)

Further reading

 Person decorated with "Officer Cross of the Order of Merit of the Republic of Poland"
 News release that includes persons decorated with "Order of Merit of the Republic of Poland"  at president.pl
 Named changed to "ORDER OF MERIT OF THE REPUBLIC OF POLAND" at geocities.com/polishnobles/merit

 
Orders, decorations, and medals of Poland
Awards established in 1974
Awards established in 1992
Merit Of The Republic Of Poland, Order of